Novosubkhangulovo (Yañı Sobxanğol) is a rural locality (a village) in Starosubkhangulovsky Selsoviet, Burzyansky District, Bashkortostan, Russia. The population was 525 as of 2010. There are 18 streets.

Geography 
Novosubkhangulovo is located 7 km north of Starosubkhangulovo (the district's administrative centre) by road. Staromusyatovo is the nearest rural locality.

References 

Rural localities in Burzyansky District